The thirteenth cycle of Holland's Next Top Model  premiered on 5 September 2022 on Videoland. Loiza Lamers replaced Anna Nooshin and reprised as the show's host.  The panel of judges has been refreshed and is composed of Guillame Philibert Chin, Phillippe Vogelenzang, and Yolanda Hadid.

The winner of the competition is 22-year-old  from Enschede. She has won a contract with The Movement Models agency and an exclusive magazine shoot in Vogue Nederland, for a fresh start to their career as a top model.

Contestants
(Ages stated are at start of contest)

Episodes

Episode 1: Beauty is Personality
Original airdate: 

This was the first casting episode where the 13 models meet each other for the first time and the new panel judges. They start with a compcard shoot and a runway/personality teach.

Best photo: Jamilcia Mandinga
Eliminated: Davey Janssen & Hamdi Abdullah & Shané van de Brom
Featured photographer: Jorien Koers
Guests: Marcus Hansma, Phoebe de Winter, Jessica Gyasi

Episode 2: Beauty is Natural
Original airdate: 

The 10 remaining models had a casting at The Movement Models and Vogue Magazine. Jerrold and Lando did the best and their prize was choosing the duo's for a shoot with Phillipe Vogelenzang where all the judges were watching.

Challenge winner: Jerrold Gunther & Lando van der Schee
Best photo: Esmee Suierveld & Philip Cossee
Bottom two: Jerrold Gunther & Lisa Fraenk
Eliminated: Jerrold Gunther
Featured photographer: Philippe Vogelenzang
Guests: Yeliz Çiçek, Robbie Baauw, Wietske Norbart, Koen Hendriks

Episode 3: Beauty is Focus 
Original airdate: 

Four new models join the group but they aren't welcomed, especially Lisa isn't happy with this twist. Loiza isn't happy with the stories about the arrival of the 4 new models and explains the focus is on itself and not on the other models.

Entered the competition: Giel van Asten, Jazz Ben Khalifa, Stijn Wanders & Valerie de Ruijter
Best photo: Jazz Ben Khalifa
Bottom two: Jamilcia Mandinga & Rosa van Gessel
Eliminated: Jamilcia Mandinga 
Featured photographer: Passian Smit

Episode 4: Beauty is Vulnerable 
Original airdate: 

The models talk to a psychologist and turns out to be more sensitive than expected. They gonna need if because they also learn how important social media is, both for private and business use. They get their first high fashion shoot.

Best photo: Esmee Suierveld & Raphael Bouman
Bottom three: Folmer Boersen, Rosa van Gessel & Stijn Wanders
Eliminated: Folmer Boersen & Stijn Wanders
Featured photographer: Dion Bal

Episode 5: Beauty is Versatility 
Original airdate: 

The models receive a workshop from top model Marjan Jonkman and she appears to have a strong opinion. The models are instructed to throw shame aside. At the end their gonna need it for a special photo shoot as a black sheep.

Best photo: Lando van der Schee
Bottom two: Lisa Fraenk & Valerie de Ruijter
Eliminated: None
Featured photographer: Lois Cohen

Episode 6: Beauty is Selling 
Original airdate: 

The models have go-sees and notice that not everyone goes well with the different brands. The shoot takes place with judge Guillaume for his clothing brand, but as a client he turns out to be even stricter than as a judge.

Best photo: Philip Cossee
Bottom two: Rosa van Gessel & Valerie de Ruijter
Eliminated: Rosa van Gessel
Featured photographer: Mikah de Wolf

Episode 7: Beauty is Sin 
Original airdate: 

The models are told that this is their last week in the Netherlands before they abroad, but there are nine candidates and only seven tickets. The models have to pull out all the stops to properly portray one of the seven sins.

Best photo: Giel van Asten
Bottom three: Lisa Fraenk, Philip Cossee & Winson Ngoh
Eliminated: Lisa Fraenk & Winson Ngoh
Featured photographer: Ramona Deckers

Episode 8: Beauty is Marble 
Original airdate: 

Best photo: Esmee Suierveld
Bottom two: Lando van der Schee & Valerie de Ruijter
Eliminated: Valerie de Ruijter
Featured photographer:

Results

 The contestants were called prior to panel, and were deemed safe
 The contestant was eliminated
 The contestant was part of a non-elimination bottom two
 The contestant won the competition

Notes

References

Holland's Next Top Model
2019 Dutch television seasons